Broken Ties is a 1918 silent film starring June Elvidge, Montagu Love, and Arthur Ashley. Ashley also directed the film. It was a William A. Brady World Pictures production. It was marketed as containing "not one dull moment". The film was based on Arthur M. Brilant's play The Alibi. The film received generally positive reviews. A write-up in Motography describes it as a tense drama. One aspect of the plot is a father forbidding his son from seeing a young woman believed to have mixed ethnic heritage.

Cast
June Elvidge as Marcia Fleming
Montagu Love as John Fleming
Arthur Ashley as Arnold Curtis
Pinna Nesbit as Corinne La Force
Alec B. Francis as Henry Hasbrook
Kate Lester as Signora Lester
Arthur Matthews as Signora La Force
Frances Miller as Mamma Liza

References

External links

1918 films
American silent feature films
1910s American films